Equinunk is a village in Buckingham and Manchester Townships in Wayne County, Pennsylvania, United States. The community's name is pronounced .

References

Unincorporated communities in Wayne County, Pennsylvania
Unincorporated communities in Pennsylvania
Pennsylvania populated places on the Delaware River